Bay du Nord is an abandoned community in Hermitage Bay, Newfoundland and Labrador.

See also
 List of ghost towns in Newfoundland and Labrador

Ghost towns in Newfoundland and Labrador